UFC 166: Velasquez vs. dos Santos III was a mixed martial arts event held on October 19, 2013, at the Toyota Center in Houston, Texas.

Background
The main event was a UFC Heavyweight Championship bout between the current champion Cain Velasquez and top contender Junior dos Santos.  The two have split their two previous encounters with Dos Santos winning the first bout via first round knockout at UFC on Fox: Velasquez vs. dos Santos and then Velasquez winning the rematch via unanimous decision at UFC 155.

A bout between Tony Ferguson and Khabib Nurmagomedov was rescheduled from UFC 164 however visa complications left Nurmagomedov unable to compete and was subsequently replaced by Mike Rio.

A bout between George Roop and Francisco Rivera was scheduled for this card, but was moved to UFC Fight Night 31 and replaced by Sarah Kaufman vs. Jessica Eye.

Matt Grice was expected to face Jeremy Larsen at the event.  However, Grice was forced out of the bout after sustaining serious injuries in a September 8 car accident in his home state of Oklahoma. Grice was replaced by Charles Oliveira who also lost his original opponent, Estevan Payan, due to injury.  Subsequently on October 5, Oliveira pulled out of the Larsen bout citing a strained thigh muscle.  Larsen instead faced promotional newcomer Andre Fili.

Luke Rockhold was expected to face Tim Boetsch at the event.  However, Rockhold was forced out of the bout citing a knee injury and was replaced by C.B. Dollaway.

Andre Fili weighed in 2.5 pounds too heavy. As a result, 20-percent of Fili's purse was forfeited to his opponent, Jeremy Larsen.

Results

Bonus awards
The following fighters were awarded $60,000 bonuses.
 Fight of The Night: Gilbert Melendez vs. Diego Sanchez
 Knockout of The Night: John Dodson
 Submission of the Night: Tony Ferguson

See also
List of UFC events
2013 in UFC

References

Ultimate Fighting Championship events
2013 in mixed martial arts
Mixed martial arts in Houston
Sports competitions in Houston
2013 in sports in Texas